Kothapalle Mandal is one of the 64 mandals in East Godavari District of Andhra Pradesh. As per census 2011, there are 16 villages.

Demographics 
Kothapalle Mandal has total population of 82,788 as per the Census 2011. Out of which 41,466 are males while 41,322 are females and the average Sex Ratio of Kothapalle Mandal is 997. The total literacy rate of Kothapalle Mandal is 59.88%. The male literacy rate is 56.19% and the female literacy rate is 50.99%.

Towns & Villages

Villages 
Amaravalli
Aminabada
Gorsa
Komaragiri
Kondevaram
Kothapalle
Kutukudumilli
Mulapeta
Nagulapalle
P. Isukapalle
Ponnada
Ramanakkapeta
Subbampeta
Uppada
Vakatippa
Yendapalle

See also 
List of mandals in Andhra Pradesh

References 

Mandals in Andhra Pradesh